Thronion or Thronium was a Greek city of the Euboians and Locrians in the border area between Illyria and Epirus, near Amantia. It is believed to lie somewhere to the south of Vlorë, between the Shushicë River and the sea. Some scholars, such as Hasan Ceka and Nicholas G.L. Hammond, have proposed Kaninë as the possible location. R.L. Beaumont, in addition to Kanina, also suggested Ploça and Klos. It was to have been founded after the Trojan War by the Abantes of Euboea and the inhabitants of the Locrian Thronium. It was taken at an early period by the inhabitants of the neighbouring town of Apollonia, and annexed to their territory, as appears from an epigram inscribed on a dedicatory offering of the Apolloniatae at Olympia.

See also
List of settlements in Illyria
List of ancient Greek cities
List of cities in ancient Epirus

References

Ancient Greek archaeological sites in Albania
Former populated places in Albania
Populated places in ancient Epirus
Illyrian Albania
Ancient Greek cities
Greek colonies in Illyria 
Euboean colonies
Lost ancient cities and towns
Greek city-states